Domeki may refer to:

 Domeki Station, a railway station in Eiheiji, Fukui Prefecture, Japan
 Masato Domeki (born 1983), Japanese ice hockey player
 Shizuka Dōmeki, a fictional character in the manga series xxxHolic
 Kai Domeki, a character in the Osu! Tatakae!  Ouendan rhythm video game duology